The 1949 VPI Gobblers football team represented Virginia Polytechnic Institute in the 1949 college football season. The team was led by their head coach Robert McNeish and finished with a record of one win, seven losses and two ties (1–7–2).

Schedule

NFL Draft selections

Players 
The following players were members of the 1949 football team according to the roster published in the 1950 edition of The Bugle, the Virginia Tech yearbook.

References 

VPI
Virginia Tech Hokies football seasons
VPI Gobblers football